The 1913 German football championship, the 11th edition of the competition, was won by VfB Leipzig, defeating Duisburger SV 3–1 in the final.

VfB Leipzig won its third national championship, having previously taken out the title in 1903 and 1906 as well as making a losing appearance in the 1911 final. Leipzig became the first club to win three German championships and would make another appearance in the final in 1914, the last in the club's history. For Duisburger SV it was the sole appearance in the championship final.

Leipzig's Paul Pömpner was the top scorer of the 1913 championship, with five goals.

Nominally eight clubs qualified for the competition played in knock-out format, the champions of each of the seven regional football championships as well as the defending German champions. The Northern German championship however was determined after the German championship had started and its winner, Eintracht Braunschweig, was unable to participate.

Qualified teams
The teams qualified through the regional championships:

Competition

Quarter-finals
The quarter-finals, played on 13 and 20 April 1913:

|}
 Holstein Kiel received a bye in the quarter-finals.

Semi-finals
The semi-finals, played on 27 April 1913:

|}

Final

References

Sources
 kicker Allmanach 1990, by kicker, page 160 to 178 – German championship
 Süddeutschlands Fussballgeschichte in Tabellenform 1897-1988  History of Southern German football in tables, publisher & author: Ludolf Hyll

External links
 German Championship 1912–13 at weltfussball.de 
 German Championship 1913 at RSSSF

German football championship seasons
1
German